Bruce Snider is an American poet originally from rural Indiana, who is an associate professor at the University of San Francisco. Previously, he taught at Stanford University, George Washington University, the University of Texas at Austin, and Connecticut College. His poems and essays have appeared in American Poetry Review, Harvard Review, Iowa Review, New England Review, Ploughshares, Poetry, Virginia Quarterly Review, Threepenny Review, Utne Reader, Zyzzyva, and Best American Poetry 2012. With the poet Shara Lessley, Snider co-edited The Poem's Country: Place & Poetic Practice (Pleiades Press), an anthology of essays.

Awards
Jenny McKean Writer-in-Washington, George Washington University
Robert Frost Fellow, Bread Loaf Writer's Conference
Lena-Miles Wever Todd Poetry Prize, Pleaides Press
Amy Clampitt House Residency
James Merrill House Residency
Wallace Stegner Fellowship, Stanford University
Felix Pollack Prize in Poetry, University of Wisconsin Press
James A. Michener Fellowship, University of Texas at Austin

Books
Fruit (University of Wisconsin Press, 2020)
The Poem’s Country: Place and Poetic Practice (Pleiades Press, 2018) co-editor
Paradise, Indiana (Pleiades Press, 2013)
The Year We Studied Women (University of Wisconsin Press, 2003)

Education
 MFA University of Texas at Austin

 BA Indiana University

References

External links
 Bruce Snider's Website

Year of birth missing (living people)
Living people
Poets from Indiana
Michener Center for Writers alumni
Indiana University alumni